The 2021 Tour de la Provence was a road cycling stage race that took place between 11 and 14 February 2021 in the French region of Provence. The race is rated as a 2.Pro event as part of the 2021 UCI Europe Tour and the 2021 UCI ProSeries, and was the sixth edition of the Tour de la Provence cycling race.

Teams 
Fourteen of the nineteen UCI WorldTeams, four UCI ProTeams, and two UCI Continental teams made up the twenty teams that participated in the race.

UCI WorldTeams

 
 
 
 
 
 
 
 
 
 
 
 
 
 

UCI ProTeams

 
 
 
 

UCI Continental Teams

Route

Stages

Stage 1 
11 February 2021 – Aubagne to Six-Fours-les-Plages,

Stage 2 
12 February 2021 – Cassis to Manosque,

Stage 3 
13 February 2021 – Istres to Mont Ventoux–Chalet Reynard,

Stage 4 
14 February 2021 – Avignon to Salon-de-Provence,

Classification leadership table

Final classification standings

General classification

Points classification

Mountains classification

Young rider classification

Team classification

References

External links 
 

2021
Tour de la Provence
Tour de la Provence
Tour de la Provence
Tour de la Provence